Mark Cheng Ho-nam (born 6 October 1964) is a Hong Kong actor. He made his name with his first starring role in the movie Cupid One with Sally Yeh. He is also known for his role as "Lam Wing" in the 1996 film Tai Chi Boxer and FuXi in My Date with a Vampire III.

Film career
Cheng started his career in 1984. Cinema City attempted to make Cheng a leading man in the mid-1980s, but these lead roles never made him a star. By the 1990s, he was often cast in Category III films and low budget girls with guns films.

Cheng also practised martial arts and performed stunts in some of the films he acted in.

Cheng made his Hollywood debut in the 2007 film War which stars Jet Li.

Personal life
In the 1980s, Cheng dated Hong Kong actress Ann Bridgewater. In 1991, Cheng was married to Japanese actress Yukari Oshima but they divorced four years later.

Cheng had since settled down in Malaysia since 1999 with his Malaysian wife Ailyn Pow whom he met during a shoot, they have a daughter named Jada.

Filmography

Films

Television series

References

External links
 
 Hong Kong Cinemagic: Mark Cheng Ho Nam
 Mark Cheng Ho-Nam

Hong Kong male actors
Hong Kong male film actors
1964 births
Hong Kong martial artists
Living people